Shotton Snowfield is a large snowfield between Herbert Mountains and Pioneers Escarpment on the north and Read Mountains on the south, in the Shackleton Range. The U.S. Navy obtained aerial photographs of the feature in 1967 and it was surveyed by British Antarctic Survey (BAS), 1968–71. Named by the United Kingdom Antarctic Place-Names Committee (UK-APC), 1971, in association with the names of glacial geologists grouped in this area, after Frederick William Shotton (1906–90), British Quaternary geologist and Professor of Geology, University of Birmingham, 1949–74.

Snow fields of Antarctica
Bodies of ice of Coats Land